Kanak Majari Sahoo (born 14 April 1957) is an Indian short story writer in Oriya language and a translator of Hindi and Bengali stories into Oriya. She currently resides in Bhubaneswar, and is a regular contributor to many Oriya journals and newspapers.

Biography 
Her original and translated stories have come out in the widely circulated Oriya dailies such as, Anupama Bharata, The Dharitri, The Sambada, and The Samayaand Oriya literary journals such as Sucharita, Kadambini, Gokarnika, Satabhisha, Bartika, Savitri, Manorama, Mahagiri, Pallibandhu, Sahakar, Arpita, Pratibeshi, Adwitiya, Singhadwara, Apurba, Sulekha, Bibhavana, Amrutayana, Pourusha, Sudhanya, Kathakara, Mukti, Pakshighara, Asha Srotaswini, Digbalaya, Kasthuri, Uttisthata, Subarnarekha, Sananda, Odisha Lekhika Sansada Journal, etc.

She has read her stories, poems and essays on All India Radio, Berhampur and taken part in many group discussions on contemporary issues at AIR, Berhampur. She has acted on stage and in some films and taken part in many cultural programs.

Kanak Majari Sahoo is the wife of the English professor and writer Dharanidhar Sahu. The couple has three children Ayaskant Sahu, Lopamudra Sahu and Monalisa Sahu.

Publications 

 ASTHARAAG, a Collection of Stories (Sarjana Publishers, Berhampur, 1998)
 ABU KHAN RA CHHELI, an Oriya translation of Zakir Hussain’s ABU KHAN KA BAKRI ( Central Sahitya Akademi, New Delhi, 2002)
 LAAL DAUDI AND OTHER STORIES, an Oriya translation of selected Bengali stories (Publisher: Prabhat Book Store, Berhampur, 2003)
 KATHAGHARA O ANYANYA GALPA, an Oriya translation of selected Hindi stories (Publisher: Vidyapuri, Cuttack, 2006)
 BATTRISHA SINHASANA, an Oriya Translation of a Sanskrit Classic of the same name by Shiva Das. Its thirty-two stories are being serialized in the Oriya monthly Kadambini.
 IN THE PIPELINE: MEM SAHIB, Oriya Translation of MEM SAHIB, a famous Bengali novel by Nimai Bhattacharya
 SUDURA JHARANAR JALE, an Oriya translation of a Bengali novel SUDUR JHARANAR JALE by Sunil Gangopadhyay
 RADHA KRISHNA, an Oriya translation of a Bengali novel of the same name by Sunil Gangopadhyay
 DARIA PARIR KATHA, a travelogue

Awards and recognitions 

Ganjam Zilla Lekhaka Samukhya, Berhampur , 2004
Upendra Bhanja Foundation, Berhampur, 2004
Kasthuri Ama Asmita, Bhubaneswar Book fair, 2005
Bibhabana Samman, Dhenkanal, 2004
Gokarnika Samman, Jaraka, 2005
Dakshina Odisha Saraswata Samman, 2005
ESEPM, Srestha Saptahika Galpa Puraskar
Purnendu Mishra Smaraki Puraskar at 14th Kalinga Book Fair 2011. 
Pramod Kumar Mahanandia Foundation Award, 2012 
The Daughter of Himalaya Award by AIPC, Kathamandu, Nepal,2012 
Tira Taranga Translation Samman 2013 
Srichandan Sahitya Academy Anubada Puraskar 2013 
Ashraya Samman 2013 
Srijan Samman, International Hindi Sammelan, Colombo, 2014. 
Anubada Samman, Orissa Lekhika Sansad, Bhubaneswar, 2014 
Anubada Samman, Srijan Gatha, Beijing, China, 2024 
Rajdhani Book Fair Award for Translation for Malala Biography 2014 
Bhubaneswar Book Fair Award for Translation 2015

External links 
 KATHAGHARA O ANYANYA GALPA on the publisher's website.

1957 births
Living people
Indian women short story writers
Writers from Odisha
21st-century Indian short story writers
21st-century Indian women writers